Kenneth Kimmins (born September 4, 1941) is an American film, television and theatre actor. He is perhaps best known for playing Howard Burleigh in the American television sitcom Coach.

Life and career 
Kimmins was born in Brooklyn, New York, and attended the Catholic University of America. Kimmins began his acting career in 1969 playing Charley Montgomery in the Broadway play The Fig Leaves Are Falling. His theatre credits include The Gingerbread Lady, The Magic Show and Status Quo Vadis. 

In 1976 Kimmins appeared in the film Network. Kimmins has guest-starred in numerous television programs including Hill Street Blues, Soap, Archie Bunker's Place, The Fall Guy, Night Court, The Bob Newhart Show, Hunter, The Love Boat, Dynasty, WKRP in Cincinnati, Cheers, Remington Steele, Highway to Heaven, The West Wing, Silver Spoons and L.A. Law.

In 1986, Kimmins starred in the new CBS's sitcom television series Leo & Liz in Beverly Hills playing Jerry Fedderson, the neighbor of the title characters. He has appeared in films such as Invaders from Mars, My Best Friend Is a Vampire, Bridge of Tunnel, Police Academy 6: City Under Siege, Stella, Some Kind of Wonderful and Shoot the Moon. Kimmins played the recurring role of "Thornton McLeish" on 11 episodes in the television soap opera Dallas then starred as Howard Burleigh in the new ABC sitcom television series Coach. His character was the boss of the main character Hayden Fox (Craig T. Nelson).

Kimmins played the recurring role of Dr. Bernard Klein in the superhero television series Lois & Clark: The New Adventures of Superman. His final theatre credit was from the Broadway play The Music Man, in 2000.

References

External links 

Rotten Tomatoes profile

1941 births
Living people
People from Brooklyn
Male actors from New York (state)
American male film actors
American male television actors
American male stage actors
American male soap opera actors
20th-century American male actors
21st-century American male actors
Catholic University of America alumni